The Masonic Temple Building, located at 217 South Capitol Avenue in Lansing, Michigan, is a former Masonic building constructed in 1924. It was listed on the National Register of Historic Places in 1980.

History
Lansing's Masonic community was established in 1849. They constructed their first temple at the turn of the twentieth century, and constructed this much larger one in 1924. The building was designed by Lansing architect Edwyn A. Bowd. The building was purchased by Cooley Law School in 1974. They continued to use the building until 2008, and put it up for sale in 2014.

Description
The former Lansing Masonic Temple is a seven-story, Classical Revival structure clad with limestone in the front and buff-colored brick on the sides and rear. The main facade has a lower basement containing a recessed entry, above which is a pedimented, antae-decorated block. Anthemion and acroterion motifs are repeated along the roofline and metal grills in the pediment frieze. The temple's interior was extensively altered by Cooley Law School to house classrooms and offices.

References

See also
 Society of Environmentally Responsible Facilities: Thomas M. Cooley Law School Temple Conference Center
 Cooley Temple Conference Center of the Cooley Law School
 Lansing Teen Court

Buildings and structures in Lansing, Michigan
National Register of Historic Places in Lansing, Michigan
Michigan State Historic Sites in Ingham County
Neoclassical architecture in Michigan
Masonic buildings completed in 1924
Former Masonic buildings in Michigan
Clubhouses on the National Register of Historic Places in Michigan